Väinö Mäkelä (20 December 1921 – 19 December 1982) was a Finnish long-distance runner who competed in the 1948 Summer Olympics. He finished in 8th place in the men's 5000 metres.

References

1921 births
1982 deaths
Finnish male long-distance runners
Olympic athletes of Finland
Athletes (track and field) at the 1948 Summer Olympics